Stora Mellby is a locality situated in Alingsås Municipality, Västra Götaland County, Sweden. It had 321 inhabitants in 2010. It contains Stora Mellby Church.

References 

Populated places in Västra Götaland County
Populated places in Alingsås Municipality